Courthouse Square Park  is a town square occupying one city block in downtown Dayton, Oregon. The  urban park is listed on the National Register of Historic Places. The park contains the historically significant blockhouse or military fortification that was originally located at Fort Yamhill. In 1911, the structure was moved to Dayton from its original site. The land for the park was donated by Joel Palmer and the park was named 'Courthouse Square' as part of an attempt to make Dayton the government seat of Yamhill County. Although Dayton did not become the county seat and no courthouse was ever constructed, the park's name remained. The Park also contains a picnic shelter, grassy areas shaded by Douglas Firs and native oaks, a basketball court, a playground and public restrooms.

References

External links 
 Description from City of Dayton Website
 Fort Yamhill State Heritage Area Master Plan 

National Register of Historic Places in Yamhill County, Oregon
Dayton, Oregon
Municipal parks in Oregon
Protected areas of Yamhill County, Oregon